The Missouri Baptist Spartans are the athletic teams that represent Missouri Baptist University, located in St. Louis, Missouri, in intercollegiate sports as a member of the National Association of Intercollegiate Athletics (NAIA), primarily competing in the American Midwest Conference (AMC) for most of its sports since the 1986–87 academic year; while its men's and women's lacrosse teams compete in the Kansas Collegiate Athletic Conference (KCAC), its men's volleyball team competes in the Heart of America Athletic Conference (HAAC), and its football team competes in the Midwest League of the Mid-States Football Association (MSFA).

Varsity teams
Missouri Baptist competes in 28 intercollegiate varsity sports: Men's sports include baseball, basketball, bowling, cross country, football, golf, lacrosse, soccer, tennis, track & field, volleyball and wrestling; while women's sports include basketball, beach volleyball, bowling, cross country, dance, golf, lacrosse, soccer, softball, stunt, tennis, track & field, volleyball and wrestling; and co-ed sports include cheerleading and eSports.

Football
Missouri Baptist's football program began competitive play in 2014. They originally played their home games at nearby Christian Brothers College High School, until Spartan Field was completed in the Spring of 2020. The Spartans football team currently plays in the MSFA, but will join the Heart of America Athletic Conference for the 2023 season. The head coach is Jason Burianek. As of the conclusion of the 2021 season, the Spartan's hold a 18-65 record all-time, with their best records coming during the 2018 and 2021 seasons at 4-7.

Men's lacrosse
The men's lacrosse program started in 2009, as a member of the MCLA. When the NAIA began sponsoring lacrosse as an emerging sport in 2016, the Spartans participated in both the NAIA, as an independent, and the MCLA, where they were a member of the Great Lakes Lacrosse Conference (GRLC). The Spartans qualified for the inaugural NAIA lacrosse national tournament in 2016 as well. The lacrosse team has been an affiliate member of the KCAC since the 2020 season.

Women's lacrosse
The women's lacrosse program also got its start in 2009.  In 2010, the program was a charter member of the National Women's Lacrosse League (NWLL), a conference for NAIA teams in the Women's Collegiate Lacrosse Associates (WCLA). In 2015, they began NAIA play as an independent, and joined the men's lacrosse team as an affiliate member of the KCAC in 2020.

Women's volleyball
The women's volleyball team is one of the premier programs in the NAIA.  They boast a 544-147 record, 4 conference championships, 13 national tournament appearances, and 2 national championships, since 2005.  Headed by Chris Nichols, the Spartans has qualified for 8 consecutive trips to the national tournament, including an appearance in the finals in 2015, which they lost. When the 2020 season was moved to Spring 2021, the Spartans won the national championship in 5 sets. They responded the next season by winning another national championship.

Athletic facilities

Spartan Field
Finished in Spring 2020, Spartan field is the home to the Spartan's football, men's and women's lacrosse, men's and women's soccer, and men's and women's track & field teams.  Spartan Field broke ground in 2014, with the help of Holland Construction Services and was originally used to host men's and women's lacrosse and soccer games, as well as football practices, until the track and stadium were completed. Spartan Field features an 8-lane track, seating for 1000 spectators, and a 11,750 sq. ft. fieldhouse that holds the coaches offices, locker rooms, weight room, concession stand, and public bathrooms.

Carl and Deloris Petty Student Recreation Complex (SRC)
Opened in 2011, the 1,000 seat gymnasium within the SRC is home to the Spartan men's and women's basketball, men's and women's volleyball, men's and women's wrestling, cheer, dance, and stunt teams. The basketball and volleyball also use the SRC as their practice facility. The SRC has coaches offices, 6 locker rooms, a Matrix fitness center, and Athletic Training Facility, and a running track.

Muncy Gymnasium
Muncy Gymnasium was the original home for the Spartan's sports teams.  When the SRC was completed, Muncy transitioned into a practice facility for the wrestling, cheer, stunt, and dance teams, and is the current home for the esports team. Muncy Gym also contains a half basketball court and the main weight room for student-athletes.

References 

Missouri Baptist Spartans
College sports teams in Missouri